The 2018 Championship League was a professional non-ranking snooker tournament taking place  It was the 11th staging of the tournament.

The defending champion John Higgins retained his title with a 3–2 final win over Zhou Yuelong. As in the previous edition of the tournament Higgins had entered the competition in Group 7 and from there won his way through to the Winners' Group.

Martin Gould and Luca Brecel both made their maiden official maximum breaks in this tournament. Gould achieved his maximum in the deciding frame of his Group 6 round robin match against . Brecel achieved his in the third frame of a 3–0 whitewash of defending champion John Higgins in their Group 7 round robin match. These were the 135th and 136th official maximum breaks and the fourth and fifth of the 2017/2018 season. It was the fifth consecutive year that a maximum was made in the Championship League, and the second consecutive year that two were made.

Prize fund 
The breakdown of prize money for the 2018 Championship League is shown below.

Group 1–7
Winner: £3,000
Runner-up: £2,000
Semi-final: £1,000
Frame-win (league stage): £100
Frame-win (play-offs): £300
Highest break: £500
Winners' Group
Winner: £10,000
Runner-up: £5,000
Semi-final: £3,000
Frame-win (league stage): £200
Frame-win (play-offs): £300
Highest break: £1,000

Tournament total: £178,900

Group 1 
Group 1 was played on 2 and 3 January 2018. Zhou Yuelong was the first player to qualify for the Winners' Group.

Matches 

Kyren Wilson 3–1 Stephen Maguire
Ryan Day 1–3 Zhou Yuelong
Anthony Hamilton 3–1 Kyren Wilson
Mark King 2–3 Michael Holt
Stephen Maguire 3–1 Ryan Day
Zhou Yuelong 3–2 Mark King
Michael Holt 1–3 Anthony Hamilton
Kyren Wilson 1–3 Ryan Day
Stephen Maguire 3–2 Zhou Yuelong
Mark King 3–2 Anthony Hamilton
Michael Holt 1–3 Zhou Yuelong
Ryan Day 3–1 Anthony Hamilton
Kyren Wilson 3–1 Michael Holt
Stephen Maguire 3–2 Mark King
Ryan Day 1–3 Michael Holt
Zhou Yuelong 3–0 Anthony Hamilton
Kyren Wilson 0–3 Mark King
Stephen Maguire 2–3 Anthony Hamilton
Ryan Day 3–2 Mark King
Stephen Maguire 3–1 Michael Holt
Kyren Wilson 3–0 Zhou Yuelong

Table

Play-offs

Group 2 
Group 2 was played on 4 and 5 January 2018. Mark Selby was the second player to qualify for the Winners' Group, recording his 500th career century in the Group 2 final against Barry Hawkins.

Matches 

 Mark Selby 3–1* Neil Robertson 
 Barry Hawkins 3–2 Kyren Wilson
 Stephen Maguire 1–3 Mark Selby
 Ryan Day 3–0 Anthony Hamilton
 Neil Robertson 3–2* Barry Hawkins 
 Kyren Wilson 1–3 Ryan Day
 
 Mark Selby 2–3 Barry Hawkins
 Neil Robertson 3–2* Kyren Wilson 
 Ryan Day 1–3 Stephen Maguire
 Anthony Hamilton 1–3 Kyren Wilson
 
 Mark Selby 2–3 Anthony Hamilton
 Neil Robertson 3–0* Ryan Day 
 Barry Hawkins 3–1 Anthony Hamilton
 Kyren Wilson 3–0 Stephen Maguire
 Mark Selby 2–3 Ryan Day
 Neil Robertson 2–3* Stephen Maguire 
 Barry Hawkins 3–1 Ryan Day
 
 Mark Selby 3–0 Kyren Wilson

Note
* Neil Robertson had to pull out of the Championship League due to personal reasons after his fifth match. Results from Robertson's previous matches were removed from the group table.

Table

Play-offs

Group 3 
Group 3 was played on 8 and 9 January 2018. Kyren Wilson was the third player to qualify for the Winners' Group.

Matches 

 Tom Ford 1–3 Mark Allen
 Ali Carter 3–2 Anthony Hamilton
 Kyren Wilson 3–2 Tom Ford
 Ryan Day 3–2 Barry Hawkins
 Mark Allen 3–0 Ali Carter
 Anthony Hamilton 3–1 Ryan Day
 Barry Hawkins 3–0 Kyren Wilson
 Tom Ford 0–3 Ali Carter
 Mark Allen 2–3 Anthony Hamilton
 Ryan Day 2–3 Kyren Wilson
 Barry Hawkins 3–2 Anthony Hamilton
 Ali Carter 2–3 Kyren Wilson
 Tom Ford 3–0 Barry Hawkins
 Mark Allen 3–0 Ryan Day
 Ali Carter 0–3 Barry Hawkins
 Anthony Hamilton 1–3 Kyren Wilson
 Tom Ford 3–1 Ryan Day
 Mark Allen 3–1 Kyren Wilson
 Ali Carter 3–2 Ryan Day
 Mark Allen 1–3 Barry Hawkins
 Tom Ford 3–1 Anthony Hamilton

Note
Anthony McGill withdrew before the tournament and was replaced by Tom Ford.

Table

Play-offs

Group 4 
Group 4 was played on 10 and 11 January 2018. Ali Carter was the fourth player to qualify for the Winners' Group. On the first day, Judd Trump made his 500th career century in his match against Liang Wenbo.

Matches 

 Shaun Murphy 3–1 Liang Wenbo
 Judd Trump 3–0 Ali Carter
 Tom Ford 2–3 Shaun Murphy
 Barry Hawkins 3–1* Mark Allen
 Liang Wenbo 0–3 Judd Trump
 Ali Carter 0–3 Barry Hawkins
 Mark Allen w/d–w/o* Tom Ford
 Shaun Murphy 0–3 Judd Trump
 Liang Wenbo 3–2 Ali Carter
 Barry Hawkins 3–1 Tom Ford
 Mark Allen w/d–w/o* Ali Carter
 Judd Trump 3–1 Tom Ford
 Shaun Murphy w/o–w/d* Mark Allen
 Liang Wenbo 3–1 Barry Hawkins
 Judd Trump w/o–w/d* Mark Allen
 Ali Carter 3–0 Tom Ford
 Shaun Murphy 2–3 Barry Hawkins
 Liang Wenbo 0–3 Tom Ford
 Judd Trump 1–3 Barry Hawkins
 Liang Wenbo w/o–w/d* Mark Allen
 Shaun Murphy 1–3 Ali Carter

Note
* Mark Allen had to withdraw due to family reasons prior to his second match in the group. The result from Allen's first match in the group was removed from the group table.

Table

Play-offs

Group 5 
Group 5 was played on 23 and 24 January 2018. Mark Williams was the fifth player to qualify for the Winners' Group.

Matches 

 Martin Gould 3–1 Ricky Walden
 Mark Williams 1–3 Ben Woollaston
 Judd Trump 3–1 Martin Gould
 Joe Perry 1–3 David Gilbert
 Ricky Walden 1–3 Mark Williams
 Ben Woollaston 1–3 Joe Perry
 David Gilbert 0–3 Judd Trump
 Martin Gould 1–3 Mark Williams
 Ricky Walden 3–2 Ben Woollaston
 Joe Perry 1–3 Judd Trump
 David Gilbert 1–3 Ben Woollaston
 Mark Williams 0–3 Judd Trump
 Martin Gould 3–1 David Gilbert
 Ricky Walden 2–3 Joe Perry
 Mark Williams 3–0 David Gilbert
 Ben Woollaston 3–2 Judd Trump
 Martin Gould 3–1 Joe Perry
 Ricky Walden 3–2 Judd Trump
 Mark Williams 3–0 Joe Perry
 Ricky Walden 3–0 David Gilbert
 Martin Gould 1–3 Ben Woollaston

Note
Barry Hawkins, Shaun Murphy and Liang Wenbo withdrew from the tournament and were replaced by Joe Perry, David Gilbert and Ben Woollaston.

Table

Play-offs

Group 6 
Group 6 was played on 25 and 26 January 2018.  Martin Gould was the sixth player to qualify for the Winners' Group.

Matches 

 Li Hang 3–0 Michael White
 Graeme Dott 3–1 Martin Gould
 Judd Trump 0–3 Li Hang
 Ben Woollaston 1–3 Ricky Walden
 Michael White 2–3 Graeme Dott
 Martin Gould 3–0 Ben Woollaston
 Ricky Walden 0–3 Judd Trump
 Li Hang 3–2 Graeme Dott
 Michael White 1–3 Martin Gould
 Ben Woollaston 1–3 Judd Trump
 Ricky Walden 0–3 Martin Gould
 Graeme Dott 0–3 Judd Trump
 Li Hang 2–3 Ricky Walden
 Michael White 3–0 Ben Woollaston
 Graeme Dott 2–3 Ricky Walden
 Martin Gould 3–2 Judd Trump
 Li Hang 1–3 Ben Woollaston
 Michael White 0–3 Judd Trump
 Graeme Dott 3–2 Ben Woollaston
 Michael White 2–3 Ricky Walden
 Li Hang 2–3 Martin Gould

Table

Play-offs

Group 7 
Group 7 was played on 26 and 27 March 2018. John Higgins was the seventh player to qualify for the Winners' Group.

Matches 

 John Higgins 0–3 Luca Brecel
 Robert Milkins 1–3 Dominic Dale
 Ricky Walden 2–3 John Higgins
 Jimmy Robertson 0–3 Judd Trump
 Luca Brecel 1–3 Robert Milkins
 Dominic Dale 1–3 Jimmy Robertson
 Judd Trump 3–1 Ricky Walden
 John Higgins 3–1 Robert Milkins
 Luca Brecel 0–3 Dominic Dale
 Jimmy Robertson 3–0 Ricky Walden
 Judd Trump 3–2 Dominic Dale
 Robert Milkins 1–3 Ricky Walden
 John Higgins 3–1 Judd Trump
 Luca Brecel 2–3 Jimmy Robertson
 Robert Milkins 1–3 Judd Trump
 Dominic Dale 2–3 Ricky Walden
 John Higgins 2–3 Jimmy Robertson
 Luca Brecel 0–3 Ricky Walden
 Robert Milkins 1–3 Jimmy Robertson
 Luca Brecel 1–3 Judd Trump
 John Higgins 3–0 Dominic Dale

Notes
Graeme Dott and Li Hang withdrew from the tournament prior to Group 7 play. They were replaced by Dominic Dale and Jimmy Robertson.

Table

Play-offs

Winners' Group 
The Winners' Group was played on 28 and 29 March 2018. In the final, John Higgins defeated Zhou Yuelong 3–2 to retain his Championship League title and win it for the second time in his career.

Matches 

 Zhou Yuelong 3*–2 Mark Selby
 Kyren Wilson 3–1 Ali Carter
 Mark Williams 3–2 Zhou Yuelong
 Martin Gould 0–3 John Higgins
 Mark Selby 3–1 Kyren Wilson
 Ali Carter 3–0 Martin Gould
 John Higgins 3–2 Mark Williams
 Zhou Yuelong 3–1 Kyren Wilson
 Mark Selby 1–3 Ali Carter
 Martin Gould 3–1 Mark Williams
 John Higgins 2–3 Ali Carter
 Kyren Wilson 3–1 Mark Williams
 Zhou Yuelong 2–3 John Higgins
 Mark Selby 3–0 Martin Gould
 Kyren Wilson 1–3 John Higgins
 Ali Carter 3–2 Mark Williams
 Zhou Yuelong 3–0 Martin Gould
Mark Selby 3–0 Mark Williams
 Kyren Wilson 3–2 Martin Gould
 Mark Selby 0–3 John Higgins
 Zhou Yuelong 2–3 Ali Carter

Notes
* Zhou Yuelong was awarded the first frame, due to Mark Selby arriving late.

Table

Play-offs

Century breaks 
Total: 116

 147 (6), 140, 108, 106, 102, 101, 101  Martin Gould
 147 (7), 109  Luca Brecel
 146, 138, 137, 121, 113, 105, 103  John Higgins
 145 (1), 122, 100  Ryan Day
 144 (5), 136, 133, 123, 111, 104, 100  Mark Williams
 143, 103, 102  Li Hang
 141 (W), 131, 122, 111, 110, 105, 100  Zhou Yuelong
 140, 137, 134, 125, 124, 120, 120, 118,110, 109, 108, 104, 103, 100, 100, 100  Judd Trump
 140, 137, 131, 129, 104  Ricky Walden
 140 (4), 115  Liang Wenbo
 139  Tom Ford
 139  Michael Holt
 138, 129, 122, 114, 104, 103, 101, 101  Barry Hawkins
 137 (3), 137, 131, 129, 105  Kyren Wilson
 136  Graeme Dott
 134, 125, 116, 107, 103, 101, 101  Ali Carter
 134 (2), 116, 110  Neil Robertson
 134, 116  Mark King
 132, 128, 112, 111, 104, 103, 103, 101, 101  Mark Selby
 125, 124, 102  Mark Allen
 122, 121, 113, 101  Jimmy Robertson
 120, 106, 103, 102, 101  Ben Woollaston
 118, 103  Anthony Hamilton
 115, 104  Stephen Maguire
 113, 111, 100  Michael White
 104  Shaun Murphy

Bold: highest break in the indicated group.

Winnings 

Green: won the group. Bold: highest break in the group. All prize money in GBP.
Notes
(1) Neil Robertson withdrew due to personal reasons after his fifth match in Group 2.
(2) Mark Allen withdrew due to family reasons after his first match in Group 4.
(3) Barry Hawkins, Shaun Murphy and Liang Wenbo withdrew from the tournament prior to Group 5 play.
(4) Graeme Dott and Li Hang withdrew from the tournament prior to Group 7 play.

References

External links 
 http://www.championshipleaguesnooker.co.uk/players/

2018
Championship League
Championship League
Sports competitions in Coventry
Championship League
Championship League